Joel Philip Stacey (born January 21, 1978) is an American singer who first gained national attention on season 6 of the television talent show American Idol. After being eliminated from the competition on May 2, 2007, he was signed to a recording contract with Lyric Street Records. His debut single, "If You Didn't Love Me", was released to radio in early 2008 as the lead-off to his self-titled debut album, which was issued April 29, 2008, on Lyric Street. Stacey's second album, Into the Light, was released on August 25, 2009, via Reunion Records.

Life and career
Stacey was born in Harlan County, Kentucky. His mother, Adrell Horn, was born in Madison County, Kentucky and works as a nurse in Smyrna, Tennessee. His father, Gary Stacey, is a Church of God (Cleveland) minister who pastors a church. Both of Stacey's grandfathers, Carlie Horn and E.T. Stacey, were also Church of God pastors. Stacey grew up in Fairfield, Ohio and began singing in church. In 2001, he joined in the U.S. Navy, and was the lead vocalist for the Navy Band Southeast.  In 2006, he served as the music minister for First Coast Christian Center in Jacksonville, Florida. He currently resides in Andover, Kansas with his wife Kendra and their two daughters, Chloe and McKayla.

Stacey graduated from Wichita Northwest High School in Wichita, Kansas in 1997. He attended Lee University in Cleveland, Tennessee. He holds a degree in vocal performance from Lee, where he was a member of one of its auditioned choirs, Lee Singers, and part of that choir's internally selected traveling ensemble, Second Edition. He was eliminated from American Idol along with Chris Richardson in the top six results episode; no one had been eliminated the week before.

Albums
In late 2007, Stacey signed to a recording contract with Lyric Street Records. His first single "If You Didn't Love Me" was released to country radio on January 7, 2008, and peaked at number 28 on the U.S. Billboard Hot Country Songs charts. It was written by Jason Sellers, Wendell Mobley, and Rascal Flatts' lead vocalist Gary LeVox. His self-titled debut album was released in April 2008. Stacey also released a promotional single entitled "Old Glory" in July, and parted ways with Lyric Street soon afterward.

On January 28, 2009, Stacey signed to Reunion Records, a Christian music label. His first album for the label, Into the Light, was released on August 25. It has sold 18,000 copies so far.

In 2011, Stacey partnered with Market America to launch Conquer Entertainment as a tool for independent artists to reach more fans through networking. Together, they released the album, Faith, as a means to promote the program and reach more artists.

Discography

Studio albums

Extended plays

Singles

Other charted songs

Music videos

American Idol performances

 Stacey was saved first from elimination.
 When Ryan Seacrest announced the results in the particular night, Stacey was among in the bottom three but declared safe second when Haley Scarnato was eliminated.
 Due to the Idol Gives Back performance, the Top 6 remained intact for another week.

References

External links

Official Phil Stacey Website

Phil Stacey Website

1978 births
21st-century American singers
American country singer-songwriters
American Idol participants
American male singer-songwriters
Living people
United States Navy sailors
American performers of Christian music
Lyric Street Records artists
People from Fairfield, Ohio
Country musicians from Kentucky
Singer-songwriters from Kentucky
People from Harlan County, Kentucky
People from Richmond, Kentucky
Singer-songwriters from Ohio
Country musicians from Ohio
21st-century American male singers
United States military musicians